The following are the national records in athletics in Nicaragua maintained by its national athletics federation: Federación Nicaragüense de Atletismo (FNA).

Outdoor
Key to tables:

h = hand timing

Men

Women

Indoor

Men

Women

References
General
World Athletics Statistic Handbook 2019: National Outdoor Records
World Athletics Statistic Handbook 2018: National Indoor Records
Specific

Nicaragua
Records
Athletics
Athletics